Mouhamadou-Naby Sarr (born 13 August 1993) is a French professional footballer who plays as centre back for Reading.

Career
Sarr made his senior debut with Olympique Lyonnais in the Europa League on 6 December 2012 against Hapoel Ironi Kiryat Shmona. He opened the score after 15 minutes, and Lyon won the game 2–0.

On 28 July 2015, Sarr joined Charlton Athletic on a five-year deal. He scored his first goal for the club against Huddersfield Town on 15 September 2015.

On 21 June 2016, Sarr joined Red Star on a season long loan deal.

On 15 December 2018, Sarr was sent off inside the first minute of Charlton's League One match against AFC Wimbledon, beating a club record previously held by Nicky Weaver.

On 11 September 2020, Sarr joined Huddersfield Town. He scored his first goal for Huddersfield in a 4–3 defeat against Stoke City on 21 November 2020.

On 1 June 2022, it was confirmed that Sarr had been released by Huddersfield Town at the end of his contract.

On 26 August 2022, after nearly a month with the club, Reading announced the signing of Sarr to a four-year contract.

International career
Sarr has played for the France U20 and France U21, but because of his father's Senegalese heritage, he received a call-up to the Senegal national football team in November 2019.

Personal life
Sarr is the son of the Senegalese footballer Boubacar Sarr and brother of Ismaïla Sarr

Career statistics

Honours
Sporting CP
Taça de Portugal: 2014–15

Charlton Athletic
EFL League One play-offs: 2019

France U20
FIFA U-20 World Cup: 2013

References

External links
 
 

1993 births
Living people
Footballers from Marseille
Association football defenders
French footballers
France youth international footballers
France under-21 international footballers
French expatriate footballers
French sportspeople of Senegalese descent
Olympique Lyonnais players
Sporting CP footballers
Charlton Athletic F.C. players
Red Star F.C. players
Huddersfield Town A.F.C. players
Reading F.C. players
Ligue 1 players
Ligue 2 players
Primeira Liga players
English Football League players
Expatriate footballers in Portugal
Expatriate footballers in England